Rote Welle may refer to:

Rote Welle (Wipper), a river of Saxony-Anhalt, Saxony, a tributary of the Wipper
Rote Welle (abandoned village), in Saxony-Anhalt, Germany